WVTK (92.1 MHz) is an FM radio station airing a classic hits radio format, licensed to Port Henry, New York, near the New York State/Vermont border.  It is owned by Vox AM/FM, LLC.

WVTK has an effective radiated power of 18,000 watts, most of which radiates into the Champlain Valley. The signal can be heard clearly in Middlebury, Bristol, Brandon, Vergennes and Charlotte, Vermont, along with Port Henry, Ticonderoga and Essex, New York. WVTK's business offices and broadcast studios are located in the Historic Marble Works Complex in Middlebury. The broadcast tower is located off Edgemont Road in Port Henry.

The station positions itself as "Addison County's Radio Station."  WVTK serves as the voice of the Middlebury College Panthers hockey and football teams, as well providing coverage for local area high school football, hockey, and basketball coverage.

History
On September 15, 1982, the station first signed on as WHRC-FM.  It was owned by Peter Edward Hunn and broadcast a soft adult contemporary format from studios and offices on Joiner Road in Port Henry.

WVTK has been through many format and ownership changes during its decades on the air.  The station was once oldies for several years under the call sign of WMNM as "Oldies 92."  It returned to oldies once again under the call sign of WLCQ ("Q92").  On May 1, 2007, an oldies format based on the 1960s, early 1970s, and late 1950s returned to 92.1 as "The True Oldies Channel", a syndicated radio service from ABC Radio Networks. The format change lasted for only about 16 months, as the new owners, the Vox Radio Group, flipped the station in early September 2008 to an adult contemporary music (AC) format, with an emphasis on serving Addison County, Vermont.  The station switched to classic hits in the summer of 2014.

Throughout the years, the station has had numerous call signs including WHRC-FM, WKLZ, WHWB-FM, WMNM, WXNT, WLCQ and WJVT. The WHWB-FM and WKLZ call signs were also used in Rutland on the 94.5 frequency prior to going dark in 1993 before the 94.5 frequency was reborn as WJEN "Cat Country." The WHWB-FM call sign was originally used on 98.1 FM in Rutland.

WVTK's current air staff includes, Bruce Zeman and his dog, Hobbes, who host "The Wake-Up Crew With Bruce & Hobbes," mid-day host J.J. Thompson, and PM Drive host, Ken Gilbert.  Zeman's dog, Hobbes, a rescued dachshund, was added as a co-host to the "Wake-Up Crew," in May, 2010, after his popularity surged as a result of mentions by Zeman on his program. Soon after, the dog became part of the program, WVTK changed the name of the morning show to "The Wake-Up Crew with Bruce & Hobbes."

As of 2011, Hobbes was the only full-time, canine, morning radio-show host in the United States. A domestic violence survivor, the dog has become arguably the most prominent canine in Vermont history. Since joining the staff of WVTK, Hobbes has been made an honorary police K-9 in three Vermont communities, and four departments -  Middlebury, Vergennes and Bristol. The dog is also an honorary deputy sheriff in the Addison County Sheriff's Department.  In 2011, Hobbes made history when he became the first canine in Vermont history to be allowed on the floor of the Vermont House of Representatives, where he was recognized for his work on behalf of animals.

The 92.1 frequency started out as a 3,000-watt facility, and was upgraded to the current 18,000 watts with additional height being added to the Port Henry tower in the early 1990s. Formats on the 92.1 frequency have included: religion, country, CHR (from 2003-2008 as 92-1 Kiss FM), adult contemporary, rock, smooth jazz (twice), and once as a part-time simulcast of news/talk 1380 WSYB in Rutland. WVTK has also held an oldies format at three different times in its history.

Clear Channel Communications (now iHeartMedia) sold its Champlain Valley radio stations to Vox Communications Group on July 25, 2008. Ken and Lori Barlow bought the station for $550,000 in 2009; Ken Barlow is one of Vox's principals. Effective August 8, 2018, Vox reacquired WVTK for $660,000.

References

External links

Classic hits radio stations in the United States
Radio stations established in 1982
1982 establishments in New York (state)
VTK